The Ancillariidae is a taxonomic family of sea snails, marine gastropod molluscs in the superfamily Olivoidea.

Genera 
Genera within the family Ancillariidae include:

 Alocospira Cossmann, 1899
 Amalda H. Adams & A. Adams, 1853
 Ancilla Lamarck, 1799
 † Ancillarina Bellardi, 1882 
 Ancillina Bellardi, 1882
 Ancillista Iredale, 1936
 Anolacia Gray, 1857
 Eburna Lamarck, 1801
 Entomoliva Bouchet & Kilburn, 1991
 Exiquaspira Ninomiya, 1988
 Micrancilla Maxwell, 1992
 Turrancilla Martens, 1903
Genera brought into synonymy
 Anaulax Roissy, 1805: synonym of Ancilla Lamarck, 1799 (unnecessary substitute name for Ancilla)
 Ancillaria Lamarck, 1811: synonym of Ancilla Lamarck, 1799 (unnecessary substitute name for Ancilla Lamarck, 1799)
 Ancillus Montfort, 1810: synonym of AncillaLamarck, 1799 (invalid: unjustified emendation of Ancilla)
 Anolacea: synonym of Anolacia Gray, 1857 (misspelling)
 Austrancilla Habe, 1959: synonym of Amalda H. Adams & A. Adams, 1853
 Baryspira P. Fischer, 1883: synonym of Amalda (Baryspira) P. Fischer, 1883 represented as Amalda H. Adams & A. Adams, 1853
 Chilotygma H. Adams & A. Adams, 1853: synonym of Ancilla (Chilotygma) H. Adams & A. Adams, 1853 represented as Ancilla Lamarck, 1799
 Dipsaccus H. Adams & A. Adams, 1853: synonym of Eburna Lamarck, 1801
 Gracilancilla Thiele, 1925: synonym of Ancillina Bellardi, 1882
 Gracilispira Olsson, 1956: synonym of Amalda (Gracilispira) Olsson, 1956 represented as Amalda H. Adams & A. Adams, 1853
 Sandella Gray, 1857: synonym of Amalda H. Adams & A. Adams, 1853
 Sparella Gray, 1857: synonym of Ancilla (Sparella) Gray, 1857 represented as Ancilla Lamarck, 1799 (original rank)

References 

 
Olivoidea
Gastropod families